In number theory, Ramanujan's sum, usually denoted cq(n), is a function of two positive integer variables q and n defined by the formula

 

where (a, q) = 1 means that a only takes on values coprime to q.

Srinivasa Ramanujan mentioned the sums in a 1918 paper. In addition to the expansions discussed in this article, Ramanujan's sums are used in the proof of Vinogradov's theorem that every sufficiently large odd number is the sum of three primes.

Notation
For integers a and b,  is read "a divides b" and means that there is an integer c such that   Similarly,  is read "a does not divide b". The summation symbol

means that d goes through all the positive divisors of m, e.g.

 is the greatest common divisor,

 is Euler's totient function,

 is the Möbius function, and

 is the Riemann zeta function.

Formulas for cq(n)

Trigonometry
These formulas come from the definition, Euler's formula  and elementary trigonometric identities.

and so on (.., ,...). cq(n) is always an integer.

Kluyver
Let  Then  is a root of the equation . Each of its powers,

is also a root. Therefore, since there are q of them, they are all of the roots. The numbers  where 1 ≤ n ≤ q are called the q-th roots of unity.  is called a primitive q-th root of unity because the smallest value of n that makes  is q. The other primitive q-th roots of unity are the numbers  where (a, q) = 1. Therefore, there are φ(q) primitive q-th roots of unity.

Thus, the Ramanujan sum cq(n) is the sum of the n-th powers of the primitive q-th roots of unity.

Example. Let q = 12. Then

 is the primitive second root of unity, and

 is the primitive first root of unity.

Therefore, if

is the sum of the n-th powers of all the roots, primitive and imprimitive,

and by Möbius inversion,

It follows from the identity xq − 1 = (x − 1)(xq−1 + xq−2 + ... + x + 1) that

and this leads to the formula

published by Kluyver in 1906.

This shows that cq(n) is always an integer. Compare it with the formula

von Sterneck
It is easily shown from the definition that cq(n) is multiplicative when considered as a function of q for a fixed value of n: i.e.

From the definition (or Kluyver's formula) it is straightforward to prove that, if p is a prime number,

and if pk is a prime power where k > 1,

This result and the multiplicative property can be used to prove

This is called von Sterneck's arithmetic function. The equivalence of it and Ramanujan's sum is due to Hölder.

Other properties of cq(n)
For all positive integers q,

For a fixed value of q the absolute value of the sequence  is bounded by φ(q), and for a fixed value of n the absolute value of the sequence  is bounded by n.

If q > 1

Let m1, m2 > 0, m = lcm(m1, m2). Then Ramanujan's sums satisfy an orthogonality property:

Let n, k > 0. Then

known as the Brauer - Rademacher identity.

If n > 0 and a is any integer, we also have

due to Cohen.

Table

Ramanujan expansions
If f(n) is an arithmetic function (i.e. a complex-valued function of the integers or natural numbers), then a  convergent infinite series of the form:

or of the form:

Ramanujan found expansions of some of the well-known functions of number theory. All of these results are proved in an "elementary" manner (i.e. only using formal manipulations of series and the simplest results about convergence).

The expansion of the zero function depends on a result from the analytic theory of prime numbers, namely that the series

converges to 0, and the results for r(n) and r′(n) depend on theorems in an earlier paper.

All the formulas in this section are from Ramanujan's 1918 paper.

Generating functions
The generating functions of the Ramanujan sums are Dirichlet series:

is a generating function for the sequence cq(1), cq(2), ... where q is kept constant, and

is a generating function for the sequence c1(n), c2(n), ... where n is kept constant.

There is also the double Dirichlet series

σk(n)
σk(n) is the divisor function (i.e. the sum of the k-th powers of the divisors of n, including 1 and n). σ0(n), the number of  divisors of n, is usually written d(n) and σ1(n), the sum of the divisors of n, is usually written σ(n).

If s > 0,

Setting s = 1 gives

If the Riemann hypothesis is true, and

d(n)
d(n) = σ0(n) is the number of divisors of n, including 1 and n itself.

where γ = 0.5772... is the Euler–Mascheroni constant.

φ(n)
Euler's totient function φ(n) is the number of positive integers less than n and coprime to n. Ramanujan defines a generalization of it, if

is the prime factorization of n, and s is a complex number, let

so that φ1(n) = φ(n) is Euler's function.

He proves that

and uses this to show that

Letting s = 1,

Note that the constant is the inverse of the one in the formula for σ(n).

Λ(n)
Von Mangoldt's function  unless n = pk is a power of a prime number, in which case it is the natural logarithm log p.

Zero
For all n > 0,

This is equivalent to the prime number theorem.

r2s(n) (sums of squares)
r2s(n) is the number of way of representing n as the sum of  2s squares, counting different orders and signs as different (e.g., r2(13) = 8, as 13 = (±2)2 + (±3)2 = (±3)2 + (±2)2.)

Ramanujan defines a function δ2s(n) and references a paper in which he proved that r2s(n) = δ2s(n) for s = 1, 2, 3, and 4. For s > 4 he shows that δ2s(n) is a good approximation to r2s(n).

s = 1 has a special formula:

In the following formulas the signs repeat with a period of 4.

and therefore,

(sums of triangles)
 is the number of ways n can be represented as the sum of 2s triangular numbers (i.e. the numbers 1, 3 = 1 + 2, 6 = 1 + 2 + 3, 10 = 1 + 2 + 3 + 4, 15, ...; the n-th triangular number is given by the formula n(n + 1)/2.)

The analysis here is similar to that for squares. Ramanujan refers to the same paper as he did for the squares, where he showed that there is a function  such that  for s = 1, 2, 3, and 4, and that for s > 4,  is a good approximation to 

Again, s = 1 requires a special formula:

If s is a multiple of 4,

Therefore,

Sums
Let

See also
Gaussian period
Kloosterman sum

Notes

References

.

 (pp. 179–199 of his Collected Papers)

 (pp. 136–163 of his Collected Papers)

External links
 

Number theory
Squares in number theory
Srinivasa Ramanujan